Juan Martín Gonella Cores (born 16 March 1996) is a Uruguayan footballer who plays as a forward for Club Sportivo Cerrito in the Uruguayan Segunda División.

References

External links
 
 
 

1996 births
Living people
Centro Atlético Fénix players
Deportivo Maldonado players
C.A. Progreso players
Sportivo Cerrito players
Uruguayan Primera División players
Uruguayan Segunda División players
Uruguayan footballers
Association football forwards